Duane Sorenson is an American business owner and restaurateur based in Portland, Oregon. His companies and restaurants have included Stumptown Coffee Roasters, Roman Candle (later converted into a cafe called Holiday), and the independent coffee company Puff. Sorenson is originally from Puyallup, Washington.

References

Living people
American restaurateurs
Businesspeople from Portland, Oregon
People from Puyallup, Washington
Year of birth missing (living people)
21st-century American businesspeople